The  is a hairstyle consisting of straight, usually cheek-length sidelocks and frontal fringe. The rest of the hair is usually worn long and straightened. The style is thought to have originated, or at least become common, in the Imperial court during the Heian period (794–1185 CE) of Japanese history, when noble women would sometimes grow out their hair for their entire lives.

History 
According to Professor Tomita of Yamano College of Aesthetics, the  cut originated from the hairstyles of noblewomen in the Heian period in Japan. When a woman reached the age of 16, the hair around her ears would be cut shorter than the rest of her hair in a ceremony called , resulting in short forelocks at the front and long hair at the back. In the Edo period, this ceremony was held on June 16 at the age of 16, and a woman's fiancee or her father or brother cut her hair.

Though not known as the  cut at the time, the name " cut" seems to have been retroactively applied in association with princesses of the Heian aristocracy, due to their depiction in media with the hairstyle.

A 1970s idol, Megumi Asaoka, is known in Japan for popularizing the  cut, which became her trademark.

Styling

The  cut is high maintenance for those without naturally straight hair, and requires frequent touch-ups on the sidelocks and front bangs in order to maintain its shape. Hair straightening is sometimes used to achieve the hairstyle's straight appearance, as well as straightening irons and specially formulated shampoos for straight hair. Humidity is also cited as a problem with certain hair types, as the curling caused by excess humidity can change the shape of the hair. Occasionally, hair extensions are used for the side locks in order to prevent this.

The hairstyle is frequently seen in Lolita fashion, especially the classification of Gothic Lolita. Within the Lolita community, the  cut is considered a more elegant alternative to other styles that may require frequent curling and crimping that can permanently damage the hair.

See also
 Pageboy
 Pixie cut
 List of hairstyles

References

External links

Hairstyles
2010s fashion
Japanese fashion